

The Sandridge Trail is a shared-use path for cyclists and pedestrians located in the inner southern suburb of Port Melbourne in Melbourne, Victoria, Australia.

It follows the former Port Melbourne railway line, now the 109 tram route. The trail is also known as the 109 tram trail, which is a misnomer since the tram goes to Box Hill, while the trail only goes to the CBD.

The trail is significant as it follows the path many new immigrants to Australia took when they first entered the country to begin a new life. See also Sandridge Bridge.

As of 2007, the Melbourne Convention Centre area is being developed further. The development is to maintain a link between the Sandridge Trail and Capital City Trail.

Following the path
At Melbourne Convention & Exhibition Centre leave the Capital City Trail by the Yarra River and head south down Clarendon Street to where the Restaurant Trams start their run at Normandy Road. The off-road trail starts here and heads west along Normandy Roadd soon arriving at the tram corral.

Connections
The Sandridge Trail connects with the Bayside Trail in the west. Heading north leads to West Gate Bridge and the Yarra River punt. Heading south leads to St Kilda. The Capital City Trail is located at the east end and runs into the Melbourne city centre. Cyclists arriving from Tasmania on the Spirit of Tasmania can access the CBD using this path.

 West end at 
 East end at

References 
Sandridge Railway Trail: rail map, notes and history
Bike rides around Melbourne 3rd edition, 2009, Julia Blunden, Open Spaces Publishing,

External links
 Bicycle Victoria - Melbourne Convention Centre
 Sandridge Railway Trail - description of the trail
 
 Immigration museum - Melbourne   
 Yarra punt 
 Restaurant tram

Bike paths in Melbourne
Transport in the City of Melbourne (LGA)
Transport in the City of Port Phillip